This is a timeline documenting the events of heavy metal in the year 2005.

Newly formed bands
5 Star Grave
A Plea for Purging
Abnormality
Acrania
Agrimonia
AM Conspiracy
Anew Revolution
Antagonist A.D.
Arise and Ruin
Arsonists Get All the Girls
As Hell Retreats
Attila
 Ava Inferi
Battle Beast 
Benedictum
Beyond Creation
 Beyond Fear
Birds of Prey
Black Tusk
Bleed from Within
Blotted Science
Bonded by Blood
Borealis
Brain Drill
The Browning
The Burial
 Carnifex
Century
Child Bite
Dark the Suns
Dawn of Solace
Death Breath
 The Devil Wears Prada
 Divine Heresy
 Five Finger Death Punch
The Foreshadowing 
Ghost Brigade 
 Ihsahn
Impending Doom
 In This Moment
 Ithilien
Kauan
Keldian
Lazarus A.D.
Lifelover
 Motionless in White
Periphery 
Powerglove
Red Fang 
 Stream of Passion
Svartsot
Swashbuckle
Thou 
Varg  
Vildhjarta 
 We Came as Romans
Wodensthrone

Reformed bands
 Alice in Chains
 Anthrax
 Devourment
 Emperor
 Nothingface
 Terrorizer

Disbanded bands
 Child's Play
 Symphony in Peril
 The 3rd and the Mortal

Albums released

January

February

March

April

May

June

July

August

September

October

November

December

Disbandments
 Exhumed (indefinite hiatus)
 Gorguts
 Sentenced

Events
 Korn guitarist Brian "Head" Welch leaves the band.
 Soilwork guitarist Peter Wichers leaves the band in late December after playing in the band for ten years to concentrate on record producing.
 Static-X lead guitarist Tripp Eisen was arrested in February for "lewd conduct against children", and was fired from the band.
 Former Vader drummer Docent dies.
 Vocalist Tarja Turunen was fired from Nightwish.
 Jason Jones' departure from Drowning Pool was publicly announced on June 14, 2005, due to irreconcilable differences. On August 25 at the Ozzfest date in Dallas, Texas, Drowning Pool did a guest shot performance on the main stage debuting their new singer Ryan McCombs.
 Visions of Atlantis lead vocalist Nicole Bogner quits and is replaced by ex-Aesma Daeva vocalist, Melissa Ferlaak. Guitarist Werner Fielder quits and is replaced by Wolfgang Koch.
 Kittie bassist Jennifer Arroyo quits and is replaced by Trish Doan. Session guitarist Lisa Marx quits and is replaced by Tara McLeod
 Hellhammer becomes Dimmu Borgir's new drummer.
 Former Metal Church singer David Wayne dies at age 47.
 Denis "Piggy" D'Amour of Voivod dies.
 American Head Charge guitarist Bryan Ottoson dies at 27.
 Motörhead picked up their first Grammy in the awards of 2005 in the Best Metal Performance category for their cover of Metallica's "Whiplash" on Metallic Attack: The Ultimate Tribute
 Sentenced members announce their break-up and the release of their last album The Funeral Album. On October 1, they play and record their final show Buried Alive (released on 2006) on their hometown Oulu, Finland.
 Dave Mustaine, frontman of Megadeth puts together music festival Gigantour for the first time.

See also
2005 in Swiss music

References

2000s in heavy metal music
Metal